Laura Guadalupe Zapata Miranda ( born July 31, 1956) is a Mexican support telenovela actress, singer, and dancer. She has acted in Televisa productions.

Life and career 
Born in Mexico City, Zapata is the daughter of Guillermo Zapata Pérez de Utrera (a Mexican boxer, model, and businessman) and Yolanda Miranda Mange. She is the maternal half-sister of Thalía (also a singer and actress), Federica, Gabriela, and Ernestina Sodi. 

Zapata is a singer and dancer. In Maria Mercedes, one of Thalía's first soap operas, Zapata played a villain opposite her sister. She is well known for her antagonist roles in telenovelas.

Zapata was married to Juan Eduardo Sodi de la Tijera. She has two sons, Claudio Sodi and Patricio Sodi.

Kidnapping
In September 2002, Zapata and her sister Ernestina Sodi were kidnapped and taken to an unspecified location. The news of their kidnapping made headlines across Latin America and among the Spanish-speaking television channels of the United States.

Their sister Thalía is married to multi-millionaire Tommy Mottola, so it was speculated that their captors would ask for a large sum of money. Instead, Zapata was released 18 days after her kidnapping, and Ernestina was released on the 34th day.

Filmography

Films

Television

Awards and nominations

Notes

References

External links

1956 births
20th-century Mexican actresses
21st-century Mexican actresses
Actresses from Mexico City
Formerly missing people
Kidnapped Mexican people
Living people
Mexican film actresses
Mexican women singers
Mexican female dancers
Mexican people of Spanish descent
Mexican stage actresses
Mexican telenovela actresses
Mexican television actresses
Singers from Mexico City